The Republican Party was a Cambodian short-lived political movement established during the Khmer Republic period (1970–75).

History

The Republican Party was one of the new parties established in the aftermath of the Cambodian coup of 1970, which had overthrown the Sangkum regime of Prince Norodom Sihanouk.

It was first formed in 1971, as the "Independent Republican Association", by Tep Khunnah, a close associate of coup leader Prince Sisowath Sirik Matak. The Republican Party was formally created on June 15, 1972 in preparation for parliamentary elections to be held that year; Sirik Matak became its secretary-general. It adopted the symbol of male and female heads, to indicate its emphasis on "family values".

The Republican Party was essentially a vehicle for Sirik Matak's interests, and functioned mainly as an alternative to the power bloc of the other coup leader General Lon Nol, whose brother Lon Non controlled the Socio-Republican Party (PSR). Whereas the latter cultivated a populist power base, encompassing both radical students and - importantly - the Khmer National Armed Forces, the Republicans attracted the urban elite, Sino-Khmer businessmen, and a handful of military officers (such as Thongvan Fanmuong). Although the Republicans' nationalist platform was in many ways similar to that of the PSR, Sirik Matak's rather aloof style placed him at a disadvantage to the populism of Lon Nol. When the elections were eventually held on September 3, 1972, the Republicans refused to participate, citing numerous irregularities in favour of the PSR.

The political situation in the Khmer Republic continued to unravel, and on March 25, 1973, Tep Khunnah was the target of an assassination attempt when a grenade was thrown into his car. The incident was widely believed to be the work of Lon Non, whose "Republican Security Battalion" was linked with such activities by Western intelligence agencies.

Pressure from the Americans, who wished to see a broader government in Phnom Penh, eventually led to Non resigning his positions and removing himself to Paris. A "High Political Council" was set up, including Sirik Matak, Lon Nol, Cheng Heng, and In Tam. Republican Party delegates were invited into the de facto coalition government, although they were not allowed to vote in an Assembly they still regarded as illegal. Tep Khunnah had in the meantime run into Lon Non in a Paris nightclub, punching him and causing him to lose several teeth.

Despite the appointment of the "High Political Council", Sirik Matak and the Republicans were unable to break the dominance of the PSR before the total collapse of the Khmer Republic on April 17, 1975.

See also

Khmer Republican Party
Democratic Party (Cambodia)
Social Republican Party
Pracheachon

References

1972 establishments in Cambodia
1975 disestablishments in Cambodia
Anti-communist parties
Buddhist political parties
Conservative parties in Cambodia
Defunct political parties in Cambodia
Nationalist parties in Cambodia
Political parties disestablished in 1975
Political parties established in 1972
Republican parties in Cambodia
Republicanism in Cambodia 
Khmer Republic